The Cayman Islands first competed at the Olympic Games in 1976, and has participated in each Summer Games since then, missing only the 1980 Summer Olympics by participating in the American-led boycott of the 1980 Summer Olympics. The Cayman Islands have yet to win any Olympic medals.

After Jamaican independence in 1962, the Cayman Islands became a separate British Overseas Territory. The Cayman Islands Olympic Committee was formed in 1973 and recognized in 1976.

The Cayman Islands made its Winter Olympic Games début at the 2010 Winter Olympics.

Medal tables

Medals by Summer Games

Medals by Winter Games

See also
 List of flag bearers for the Cayman Islands at the Olympics
 Tropical nations at the Winter Olympics

References

External links